Night Goblin is a South Korean television program starring Lee Soo-geun, Jeong Hyeong-don,  Park Sung-kwang, Lee Hong-gi and Kim Jong-hyeon. It is a reality show where in each episode, the cast will attempt to be the first in line to enter various popular places for food or recreation throughout South Korea.

JTBC runs the show in prominent Sunday evenings time slot, at 18:30 (KST), starting with the first airdate on July 30, 2017.

On 26 February 2018 JTBC announced that the program will have its final episode in mid-March.
The last episode was aired on March 18.

Cast

Former

Program
The special rule mentioned is that if the group did not manage to get in first place, they will have to reattempt to get first place again for the same main mission.

Current
From episode 27, the Night Goblins will take on a team of guests for broadcast airtime. The concept of No Nights 2 Days will still go on. Both teams will have their own hot places to recommend and go by themselves, and depending on the editors of the show, airtime is allocated to each team as they favour.

Former
In each episode, the cast and guest(s) gather together at around 12 a.m. (KST), then proceed to their base camp, which was set up nearby the popular place. The base camp was set up such that the group are able to monitor the popular place for any movements. At the base camp, they will be camping overnight and, in the next morning, attempt to be the first in line as a team to enter the popular place. Before the start of the overnight camping, the group's handphones are confiscated. The reason being, if not, the group can just set alarms on their phones and wake up in the morning just in time to start to get for first place, which is not allowed at all.

During the overnight camping, a time fairy will appear to help the cast by telling the time and get the cast to play the time fairy's game to get over the overnight camping and elevate the chances of entering in first place.

From episode 6, the show's production concept was altered (to No Nights 2 Days) so that filming on each location is now split into 2 episodes, with first half filmed during the day. The first of every 2 episodes will not involve overnight camping, as the targeted hot place(s) opens either at noon, evening or night. The second will involve the original concept of the program. Team and individual battles will also be introduced. Guest(s) are invited to spend the day and/or night together with the cast.

Episodes

2017

2018

Unaired episode
Episode 21 (which was supposed to be on broadcast on 24 December 2017), originally the 2nd half of the Incheon trip and Christmas Special, was supposed to feature SHINee's Jonghyun & Minho as guests. However, on December 18, 2017 Jonghyun suddenly passed away in a suspected suicide. Following the initial news, JTBC Entertainment's YouTube channel has made the video of the episode teaser (uploaded a day prior) "unavailable". It was later announced that the episode will be (initially) put on hold until further notice, with the episode on 24 December 2017 (the original broadcast date) to be a special broadcast of the show.

Ratings
In the ratings below, the highest rating for the show will be in red, and the lowest rating for the show will be in blue each year.

2017

2018

References

External links
 

South Korean travel television series
JTBC original programming
Korean-language television shows